LaMar Lemmons Jr. is an American politician and businessman.

Lemmons served as a member of the Michigan State House of Representatives. He served in the Michigan State House of Representatives from 2005 to 2010. He is a Democrat.

Early life
Lemmons was born in Memphis, Tennessee, where he lived until he moved to Detroit in 1950. He attended Detroit Public schools until he enlisted in the Air Force. Lemmons served at Ashiya Air Force Base in Japan. He attended the Detroit Institute of Technology. He worked for the Ford Motor Company until he founded his own business, Lemmons Transportation. Lemmons has four children, including former Rep. LaMar Lemmons III.

Electoral history
2006 campaign for State House
LaMar Lemmons Jr. (D), 96%
Edith Floyd (R), 4%
2004 campaign for State House
LaMar Lemmons Jr. (D), 95%
Edith Floyd (R), 5%

References 

Living people
Politicians from Nashville, Tennessee
Politicians from Detroit
Businesspeople from Detroit
Military personnel from Detroit
Members of the Michigan House of Representatives
African-American state legislators in Michigan
Detroit Institute of Technology alumni
Year of birth missing (living people)
21st-century African-American people